"Girls Girls" (stylized as "GIRLS GIRLS") is a song by Swedish electropop duo Icona Pop. It was written by Litens Anton Nilsson, Icona Pop, Marcus Andersson, Tove Lo, Emma Bertilsson and Johan Gustafson, with the latter one handling the song's production. It was released commercially for digital download on 16 June 2017, through TEN Music Group, Atlantic Records and Warner Music Group, as the duo's first single of 2017.

Music video
The official music video was released on Icona Pop's YouTube channel on 16 June 2017. It included selfies from the duo themselves, as well as selfies collected from their fans.

Critical reception
Rob Copsey of Official Charts Company wrote that the song "sounds like summer", "sees Icona Pop sticking to what they know best, i.e, great, big, stomping neon pop, albeit with a deep/tropical house edge to it this time out" and "ends in such an abrupt way that you'll want to put it straight back on." Similarly, Raisa Bruner of Time magazine also noted it "sounds like summer" and regarded the song as "a club-ready groove mixing their signature singalong choruses with a tropical house edge". Mike Wass of Idolator said that the song is "a soaring tune" and "a club-ready, pop-centric party anthem that really should be blasting out of every radio over the summer". Lilian Min of HelloGiggles said the song has "an excellent bubbly beat and a refreshing femme-centric vibe".

Credits and personnel
Credits adapted from Tidal.
 Icona Pop – composing, vocals
 Johan Gustafson – composing, producing, mixing
 Litens Anton Nilsson – composing
 Marcus Andersson – composing
 Tove Lo – composing
 Emma Bertilsson – composing
 Chris Gehringer – mastering engineering
 Nicki Adamsson – engineering

Charts

Certifications

References

2017 singles
2017 songs
Icona Pop songs
Songs written by Tove Lo
Songs written by Aino Jawo
Atlantic Records singles
Songs written by Caroline Hjelt